The state of South Carolina is served by the following area codes:

 803 and 839, which serves central South Carolina, including Columbia
 843 and 854, which serves eastern and coastal South Carolina
 864, which serves northwest South Carolina

Area code list
 
South Carolina
Area codes